The National Opposing Union (abbreviated as UNO) was a Salvadoran political coalition which existed from 1972 to 1979. The coalition was composed of the Christian Democratic Party, the National Revolutionary Movement, and the Nationalist Democratic Union.

History 

The coalition was formed to oppose the National Conciliation Party, the military controlled political party which controlled El Salvador. UNO ran in the presidential elections of 1972 and 1977. The elections were rigged however and despite sources claiming that UNO won both elections, official reports stated that the PCN won both elections.

Electoral results

Presidential elections

Legislative Assembly elections

References 

1970s establishments in El Salvador
1970s disestablishments in El Salvador
Defunct political parties in El Salvador
Political parties established in 1972
Political parties disestablished in 1979